Perumbavoor State assembly constituency is one of the 140 state legislative assembly constituencies in Kerala state in southern India.  It is also one of the 7 state legislative assembly constituencies included in the Chalakudy Lok Sabha constituency.
 As of the 2021 assembly elections, the current MLA is Eldhose Kunnappilly of INC.

Local self governed segments
Perumbavoor Niyamasabha constituency is composed of the following local self-governed segments:

Members of Legislative Assembly 
The following list contains all members of Kerala legislative assembly who have represented the constituency:

Key

Election results 
Percentage change (±%) denotes the change in the number of votes from the immediate previous election.

Niyamasabha Election 2021 
There were 1,84,514 registered voters in the constituency for the 2021 Kerala Niyamasabha Election.

Niyamasabha Election 2016 
There were 1,72,965 registered voters in the constituency for the 2016 Kerala Niyamasabha Election.

Niyamasabha Election 2011 
There were 1,54,432 registered voters in the constituency for the 2011 election.

See also
 Perumbavoor
 Ernakulam district
 List of constituencies of the Kerala Legislative Assembly
 2016 Kerala Legislative Assembly election

References 

Assembly constituencies of Kerala

State assembly constituencies in Ernakulam district
Kerala Legislative Assembly